FROM JAPAN Limited（株式会社フロムジャパン Kabushikigaisha Furomu Japan）is a Japanese eCommerce site which provides international services to purchase and ship items from major Japanese online shopping and auction sites on behalf of users living outside of Japan.

History 
From Japan initially started as a Yahoo! Auctions Japan bidding proxy service in 2004. In the following year, the company added the service to order from major Japanese online shopping sites and continues to provide this service presently. They are expanding as a business providing a one stop simple solution for people residing outside of Japan that wish to shop from Japanese websites, but are unable to due to the language barrier or other restrictions such as stores not shipping overseas.

As one of Japan's first international E-Commerce proxies, they pride themselves in having the only userbase in Japan consisting of registered members residing in 196 countries.

The website operates in English, Chinese (Simplified and Traditional), French, Spanish, Korean, Indonesian, Thai, Italian, and Japanese. 
The company also offers a service to "Simply put up a banner and start selling globally", aimed to support Japanese E-Commerce companies with large amounts of traffic from abroad that wish to expand their market overseas, contributing to the vitalization of small and middle-sized E-Commerce companies in Japan.

Company timeline 
 2004
March – Established FROM JAPAN Co.,Ltd. in Shirakawa, Koto, Tokyo
August – Began operating as a proxy service for bidding on Yahoo! Japan auctions
 2005 October – Began operating as a proxy service for Japanese shopping sites
 2006 – Business partnership with Yahoo! Hong Kong
 2011
June – Headquarters moved to 2-7-4 Aomi, Koto, Tokyo
September – Introduced a service for Japanese E-Commerce sites to sell their products internationally by "Simply place a banner to sell overseas".
 2012
October – Headquarters moved to 1-4-14 Hirakawacho, Chiyoda, Tokyo
Collaboration with Rakuten – 5% off Rakuten Products Campaign
 2014 September – Headquarters moved to 1-1-1 Hirakawacho, Chiyoda, Tokyo
 2015
August – Headquarters moved to 3–12 Kioicho, Chiyoda, Tokyo
October – Site relaunch with mobile support
 2016
November – Headquarters moved to 2–1–5 Shinkawa, Chuo, Tokyo

References

External links 
 株式会社 FROM JAPAN
 株式会社 FROM JAPAN　コーポレートサイト
 バナーをはるだけで海外販売サービス

Service companies based in Tokyo
Japanese companies established in 2004
Logistics companies of Japan